Plaka (former name: Μορόχοβα - Morochova) is a village in the municipal unit of Aroania, Achaea, Greece.  In 2011, it had a population of 99. It is situated in the southern foothills of Mount Erymanthos. It is 2 km southeast of Agrampela, 4 km west of Livartzi and 25 km southwest of Kalavryta.

Population

See also

List of settlements in Achaea

External links
Plaka at the GTP Travel Pages

References

Aroania
Populated places in Achaea